Virginia Wahlbom Ehrhart (born December 10, 1964) is an American politician representing the 36th House District in Georgia. Prior to serving in the House, she had worked as a chef and talk show host. Her husband, Earl Ehrhart, is the former representative for this district. Ginny announced her candidacy immediately following her husband's announcement of retirement. She ran against Tom Gray in the Republican primary, winning 51.4% of the vote, and Jen Slipakoff in the general election. She is against gun control, and supports the Religious Freedom Restoration Act. She was criticized in October 2018 for stating that transgender individuals "shouldn't receive [special rights] whether they identify 'as a man or a moose'".

References

Living people
Republican Party members of the Georgia House of Representatives
People from Powder Springs, Georgia
21st-century American politicians
21st-century American women politicians
Women state legislators in Georgia (U.S. state)
1964 births